Broderick Thompson (born 19 April 1994 in North Vancouver) is a Canadian World Cup alpine ski racer. During the 2014–15 season, he was the Nor-Am Cup champion in super-G and scored his first World Cup point, finishing thirtieth in a combined event at Wengen.

Thompson competed in the 2018 Winter Olympics, and the 2021 World Championships. He is the brother of ski cross racer Marielle Thompson (b.1992).

Thompson scored his first World Cup podium on 2 December 2021, finishing 3rd. Thompson started the Beaver Creek, Colorado super-g with bib 35 and put down a time just under a second back from race winner Marco Odermatt from Switzerland.

In January 2022, Thompson was named to Canada's 2022 Olympic team.

World Cup results

Season standings

Top twenty finishes
 0 wins
 1 podium (1 SG), 8 top twenties

World Championship results

Olympic results

References

External links

 
 
 Broderick Thompson at Alpine Canada

1994 births
Living people
Alpine skiers at the 2018 Winter Olympics
Alpine skiers at the 2022 Winter Olympics
Canadian male alpine skiers
Olympic alpine skiers of Canada
Sportspeople from North Vancouver